John Wolfe may refer to:

 John Wolfe (printer) (1548?–1601), English bookseller and printer
 Jack A. Wolfe (1936–2005), American paleontologist
 John Bascom Wolfe  (1904–1988), American social and behavioral psychologist
 John Clay Wolfe (born 1972), American radio personality and entrepreneur
 John Wolfe Jr. (born 1954), Tennessee politician
 John P. Wolfe (born 1970), American chemist
 John Richard Wolfe  (1832-1915), Irish missionary who served in China
 John Thomas Wolfe (1955–1995), veterinarian and Canadian provincial politician 
 John T. Wolfe Jr. (born 1942), president of Savannah State College

See also
 John Wolfe Barry (1836–1918), English civil engineer
 Jack Wolfe (disambiguation)
 John Wolf (disambiguation)